The U.S. state of Alabama is currently divided into seven congressional districts, each represented by a member of the United States House of Representatives.

Since the 1973 redistricting following the 1970 U.S. census, Alabama has had seven congressional districts. This is three fewer districts than the historic high of ten congressional districts just prior to the 1930 census.

Current districts and representatives
The delegation has seven members: 6 Republicans and 1 Democrat.

Redistricting

2000s
The redistricting in 2002 following the 1990 census marginally strengthened the Democratic position, but did not contribute to any net changes by the parties over the decade. The biggest change in 2002 was to the 3rd district, which lost then arch-Republican stronghold St. Clair County in exchange for more Democratic parts of Montgomery County, including the area around the capitol. The district's black composition rose by 7 percent as a result. However, this did not lead to an unseating of the Republican member. The seat flips during the decade were a fluke flip of the Wiregrass-based 2nd district in the Democratic wave of 2008, and a flip (via party switch and then election of a different Republican) of the Huntsville and north Alabama-based 5th district as part of the continuing realignment of the rural white South towards nearly unanimous support for the Republican party.

The Alabama Legislature is in charge of apportionment and redistricting in Alabama. A bipartisan interim committee of 22 representatives (11 from the Alabama House of Representatives, and 11 from the Alabama Senate) is formed to develop a redistricting plan for recommendation to the legislature. The governor has veto power over both the state legislative and congressional plans.

All redistricting plans in recent history have been court-ordered due to a failure on the part of the legislature to enact their own plans. The redistricting plan adopted after the 1990 census was first proposed by Republicans and ordered into effect by the federal courts. That plan moved black residents out of the 2nd and 6th districts, which had been competitive for Democrats.

The 6th and 7th districts are considered by redistricting watch organizations such as Fair Vote and the National Committee for an Effective Congress to be "irregular" or "gerrymandered".

After a federal trial court rejected a racial gerrymandering claim regarding state house districts, the United States Supreme Court vacated and remanded.  The five justice majority found “there is strong, perhaps overwhelming, evidence that race did predominate as a factor”.  Because the trial court had wrongly looked for racial gerrymandering at the statewide level the Supreme Court ordered the trial court to instead look at each district individually.

2020s
The initial map after the 2020 census passed by the Republican-controlled legislature in November 2021 did not differ from the previous decade's map. It drew a single district with a heavily black population by putting the most heavily African-American areas of Jefferson and Tuscaloosa counties in with much of the heavily African-American Black Belt and heavily African-American parts of the capital county of Montgomery.

In a per curiam opinion on January 24, 2022, the United States District Court for the Northern District of Alabama blocked as illegal the map passed by the Alabama legislature after a lawsuit was filed by the ACLU and the NAACP Legal Defense and Educational Fund, ordering the legislature to draw two districts with either Black voting-age population majorities or “in which Black voters otherwise have an opportunity to elect a representative of their choice.” This case reached the Supreme Court soon after. Subsequent briefing followed and oral argument culminated on October 4, 2022. The question presented for deliberations amongst the Justices and an eventual opinion is: "Whether the state of Alabama's 2021 redistricting plan for its seven seats in the United States House of Representatives violated section 2 of the Voting Rights Act, 52 U. S. C. §10301.21"

History of congressional delegation 

Alabama is typical of most southern states in its pattern, although there are a few interesting deviations. Admitted into the union in 1819, it first appointed members in the 18th United States Congress in 1823. Alabama's growing population coupled with the expansions of the United States House of Representatives meant that by the time the Civil War broke out, Alabama had seven seats - all of which had been dominated by either Democrats or Democratic-Republicans up to that point.

After the civil war, Alabama was subject to the Reconstruction and placed under an effective military control for a period. Typical of this era, freedmen were given the right to vote, and the Republican federal government installed Republican candidates as senators, congressmen and governors. Alabama was no exception. However, by 1874 the Democratic party had re-established itself in Alabama, and a series of redistrictings and then punitive race laws ensured that no Republicans remained congressmen after 1877.

With very little deviation, Southern Democrats (Dixiecrats) remained steadfastly dominant in Alabama until 1965. Over the next 30 years Republicans and Democrats shared representation of Alabama in Congress.

By 1997 the Republicans had come to dominate Alabama's congressional holdings.

Historical and present district boundaries
Table of United States congressional district boundary maps in the State of Alabama, presented chronologically. All redistricting events that took place in Alabama between 1973 and 2013 are shown.

See also

List of United States congressional districts
United States Congress
Politics of Alabama

References

 
Congressional districts